San José de Jáchal (often shortened to Jáchal) is a city in the northeast of the province of San Juan, Argentina, located on National Route 40, south of the Jáchal River.

Climate

References

 

Populated places in San Juan Province, Argentina
Cities in Argentina
Argentina
San Juan Province, Argentina